Dulu may refer to:

 Dulu, North Khorasan, Iran
 Dulu, Razavi Khorasan, Iran

See also 
 Duolu
 Dulo
 Dolo (disambiguation)